Eves on Skis is a 1963 British naturist documentary from Edward Craven Walker. It was not a success at the box office.

References

External links
Eves on Skis at IMDb

British documentary films
Nudity in film